Universitario de Trujillo is a Peruvian football club, playing in the city of Trujillo, Peru. They currently play in the second division of the Liga Distrital de Trujillo.

History
In the 2009 Copa Perú, the club classified to the National Stage, but was eliminated by Defensor San José of Tumbes.

In the 2011 Copa Perú, the club classified to the National Stage, but was eliminated by Los Caimanes in the Round of 16.

Honours

Regional
Región II: 1
Winners (1): 2009
Runner-up (1): 2011

Liga Departamental de La Libertad: 2
Winners (2): 2009, 2011

Liga Distrital de Trujillo: 2
Winners (2): 1983, 2009
 Runner-up (3): 2000, 2008, 2011

See also
List of football clubs in Peru
Peruvian football league system

External links
 Los 16 expedientes

Football clubs in Peru
Association football clubs established in 1965